The New South Wales Women's Amateur Championship is the state amateur golf championship of New South Wales, Australia. It was first played in 1903.

Winners

2011 Grace Lennon
2010 Sue Wooster
2009 Justine Lee
2008 Bree Arthur
2007 Jenny Lee
2006 Sarah Oh
2005 Sarah Oh
2004 Helen Oh
2003 Julie Swanson
2002 Nikki Campbell
2001 Nikki Campbell
2000 Nikki Campbell
1999 Carlie Butler
1998 Nadina Campbell
1997 Adele Bannerman
1996 Stacey Doggett
1995 Alison Wheelhouse
1994 Renee Fowler
1993 Karrie Webb
1992 Rachel Hetherington
1991 Cathy Neilson

Source:

See also
New South Wales Amateur
Australian Women's Interstate Teams Matches

References

External links

Amateur golf tournaments in Australia
Golf in New South Wales
Recurring sporting events established in 1903
1903 establishments in Australia
Women's golf in Australia